Risögrund is a locality situated in Kalix Municipality, Norrbotten County, Sweden with 697 inhabitants in 2010.

Sports
The following sports clubs are located in Risögrund:

 Assi IF

References 

Populated places in Kalix Municipality
Norrbotten